is a Shinto shrine in Chikugo, Fukuoka Prefecture, Japan. It was founded in 1226 in honour of Sugawara no Michizane. The honden was rebuilt in 1672 and designated a prefectural cultural property in 1961.

See also
 Tenman-gū
 Dazaifu Tenman-gū

References

External links
 Mizuta Tenmangū homepage

Tenjin faith
Shinto shrines in Fukuoka Prefecture